Marco Tabai (born 18 November 1961) is an Italian former professional racing cyclist. He rode in the 1988 Tour de France.

References

External links
 

1961 births
Living people
Italian male cyclists
Cyclists from the Province of Brescia